The Girl from Värmland  (Swedish: Flickan från Värmland) is a 1931 Swedish drama film directed by Erik A. Petschler and starring Petschler, Gucken Cederborg and Arnold Sjöstrand. The film's sets were designed by the art director Vilhelm Bryde.

Cast
 Greta Anjou as Greta Blom
 Gucken Cederborg as 	Madame Ninon
 Märta Claesson as Greta's Mother
 Knut Lambert as 	Squire
 Herrie de Kahn as Squire's Wife
 Erik A. Petschler as 	Lehr
 Arnold Sjöstrand as Erik Björck
 Oscar Byström as 	Chief Superintendent
 Artur Cederborgh as 	Detective
 Elin Svensson as Buller-Stava
 May von Voss as 	Flora
 Carin Ygberg as 	Model
 Nils Åhsberg as 	Tok-Jan

References

Bibliography 
 Krawc, Alfred. International Directory of Cinematographers, Set- and Costume Designers in Film: Denmark, Finland, Norway, Sweden (from the beginnings to 1984). Saur, 1986.
 Nelmes, Jill & Selbo, Jule. Women Screenwriters: An International Guide. Palgrave Macmillan, 2015.

External links 
 

1931 films
Swedish drama films
1931 drama films
1930s Swedish-language films
Films directed by Erik A. Petschler
Swedish black-and-white films
Films set in Stockholm
1930s Swedish films